Guye Adola Idemo (born 20 October 1990) is an Ethiopian long-distance runner who specialises in the half marathon.

Born in Adola in Ethiopia's Oromiya Region, he began training with Gianni Demadonna's group and came to prominence in 2014. His first high level race was the Marrakech Half Marathon in January that year, which he won in a best of 61:26 minutes. He then placed fourth at the Ethiopian half marathon championships.

His international debut shortly followed and he was Ethiopia's best performer at the 2014 IAAF World Half Marathon Championships, taking the individual bronze medal in a personal best of 59:21 minutes to lead the Ethiopian men to third in the team competition. Following his first major medals, he ran on the circuit and took third at the Giro Media Blenio in Switzerland and the Luanda Half Marathon in Angola. He won the 2014 Delhi Half Marathon in New Delhi with his personal best of 59:06.

In his marathon debut in the  2017 Berlin Marathon he challenged Eliud Kipchoge and came second with a finishing time of 2:03:46, the fastest marathon-debut ever.

In 2020, he competed in the men's race at the 2020 World Athletics Half Marathon Championships held in Gdynia, Poland.

In 2021, he won the men's race at the 2021 Berlin Marathon.

References

External links

Living people
1990 births
Ethiopian male long-distance runners
Sportspeople from Oromia Region
Athletes (track and field) at the 2019 African Games
African Games competitors for Ethiopia
Berlin Marathon male winners
21st-century Ethiopian people